Zabaan Sambhalke (transl. Watch Your Tongue) is an Indian Hindi sitcom directed by Rajiv Mehra. It is the Indian version of the British sitcom Mind Your Language (1977). 
The show ran for two seasons, first in 1993–1994 with 54 episodes on DD Metro Channel, and later in 1997–1998 with another 52 episodes on Home TV. The show featured actors Pankaj Kapur, Viju Khote, Shubha Khote and Tom Alter. Reruns also aired on SAB TV, Bindass and Shemaroo TV.

Overview
Mohan Bharti (Pankaj Kapur) is an engineer who is forced to teach Hindi in a language school. His students are from throughout the world. Along with them is the obnoxious principal Miss Lata Dixit (played by Shubha Khote) of the (National Institute of Language, aka NIL). It had the "I-hate-my-job", "lost-in-translation" and culture shock situations.

Cast and characters 
Mohan Bharti, played by Pankaj Kapur, is an engineer who is forced to teach Hindi in the National Institute of Language, NIL. He hates his job but has no choice. Like Barry Evans as Jeremy Brown, he is charming and handsome and is shorter than all the girls in his class. The girls of the class and the receptionist flirt with him. He constantly complains to Miss Dixit about increasing his salary. He often loses his temper, yells at students and walks out of class.
Sneh Lata Dixit, played by Shubha Khote, is referred in the show as Miss Dixit. She is the obnoxious principal who is poked fun at for her weight and miser attitude. She is a shrewd business woman, who has never married and often dreams of being a Bollywood actress. Later in the show she has a romantic interest in a Russian student Anatoli Molatov.
Archana, played by Meenakshi Shukla, is Miss Dixit's secretary. She has a small role but is shown in almost all episodes. She seems to have a crush on Mohan Bharti, and she often teases him.
Prem Prakash Chaturvedi aka PP Chaturvedi, played by Chandu Parkhi, is the peon. His job is to serve tea, and he is often seen sharing jokes with Archana.
Vijaya Southeast aka Miss Vijayadurai from Madurai, played by Bhavana Balsavar, is a Tamil actress aspiring for roles in Hindi films.
Charles Spencers, played by Tom Alter, is a British writer living in India. He is later shown married to an Indian woman, played by Asawari Joshi.
Makkhan Singh, played by Rajinder Mehra, is a Sikh government employee who recently got transferred to Mumbai from Punjab.
Jennifer Jones, played by Tanaaz Irani, is a flight attendant for American Airlines. She plays the stereotype - wearing short skirts and high heels.
Mungwango Asoyo, played by Simon Asoyo, is from Congo. He is probably the best student when it comes to Hindi. He once bought kebabs for Miss Dixit on her birthday which were made of snakes; he said they were "Snake Kebab" which because of his pronunciation were taken as "Seenkh Kebab".
Vittal Bapurao Pote, played by Viju Khote, is a Maharashtrian who works in a local "Nautanki". He often comes to class in play costumes.
Anatoli Molatov, played by Hosi Vasunia, is a Russian diplomat. He is the romantic interest of Miss Dixit. He carried a bottle of vodka which was often mistaken as water by his classmates.
Sheikh Ruslan-Al-Sulaah, played by Keith Stevenson, is an Arabian sheikh. He is an oil magnate and quite rich, and wears the white robe and typical sheikh headgear. He has many cars and he is so rich that even the jerrycan for keeping spare fuel in the car is made of gold. His Hindi is worst in the class, while his last name "Sulaah" was often heard as "Salaa" which is a derogatory remark in Hindi.
Keki Dastoor Contractor, played by Dinyaar Tirandaz, is a Parsi. He has a laid-back attitude and really bad poetry.
Vivek Vaswani, played by Vivek Vaswani, is a sindhi. He is an NRI and rich, but he is a penny pincher and often paranoid about people tricking him and stealing his money.
Dimple Shah played character of Rupali, who is a highly talkative Gujarati girl.
Mr. Mukherjee, played by Anant Mahadevan, is a Bengali Magician, often getting into arguments with Ruslan.

Guest
Rock Patel, played by Javed Jaffrey, is seen in two episodes. He is an NRI and a rapper. His catchphrase is YO!, which annoys Mohan Bharti.
Seema Stallone, played by Moon Moon Sen, she is seen in one episode, she is NRI from US, Texas and has a crush on Mohan Bharati and lovingly calls him Honey Bun.
Praful Popat Dalal, played by Deven Varma, he is seen in one episode, He plays the role of Street Vendor, selling assorted goods from a suitcase on wheels.
Johnny Uttolandand, played by Johnny Lever, he is seen in one episode, He plays the role of local gangster who wants to learn Hindi because he is standing for elections.
Paplu, played by Rakesh Bedi, He is seen in 2 episodes and gift pom-pom (a car) to Mohan Bharti
Rajjo played by Ahmad Harhash, he been in a Car accident

Home media and streaming services
Shemaroo Entertainment released VCD  and DVD sets of the complete series in 2009.

See also
 List of Hindi comedy shows

References

External links

Hindi comedy shows
Indian television sitcoms
Indian comedy television series
1993 Indian television series debuts
1997 Indian television seasons
Television series about educators
Indian television series based on British television series
DD Metro original programming
1998 Indian television series endings